Johann Friedrich Hahn (28 December 1753 in Gießen – 30 May 1779 in Zweibrücken) was a German lyric poet.

Hahn, an evangelical Lutheran, began his studies on 22 April 1771 at the University of Göttingen, first law, then theology. On 12 September 1772 he helped to establish the Göttinger Hainbund literary group.

After his graduation he became a confidant of Johann Heinrich Voss. Because of his nationalistic outlook, Voss nicknamed him Teuthard and said he was an "unfortunate hypochondriac" (unglücklicher Hypochondrist).

On 11 May 1774, along with Friedrich Leopold Graf zu Stolberg, he became a Freemason in the Zu den drei Rosen lodge of Hamburg. In June 1774 he helped found the Zum goldenen Zirkel lodge in Göttingen, and on 18 November 1774 he was elected Master.

He died on 30 May 1779 at the age of twenty-five, apparently in the throes of mental illness.

Works 
 Gedichte und Briefe ("Poems and letters", 1880)

Notes 

1753 births
1779 deaths
German poets
German male poets